Sunny Valley is an unincorporated community in Josephine County, Oregon, United States.  Sunny Valley lies just east of exit number 71, the Sunny Valley exit, on Interstate 5.

Grave Creek, a tributary of the Rogue River, flows through Sunny Valley. Grave Creek Bridge, a covered bridge, carries Sunny Valley Loop Road over the creek.

References

Unincorporated communities in Josephine County, Oregon
Unincorporated communities in Oregon